The 1987 Arkansas Razorbacks football team represented the University of Arkansas during the 1987 NCAA Division I-A football season.

Schedule

Roster
QB Quinn Grovey, Fr.

References

Arkansas
Arkansas Razorbacks football seasons
Arkansas Razorbacks football